Dalecarlian (dalmål in Swedish) is a group of East and West Scandinavian languages, and their respective dialects spoken in Dalarna County, Sweden. Some Dalecarlian varieties can be regarded as part of the Swedish dialect group in Gästrikland, Uppland, and northern and eastern Västmanland. Others represent a variety characteristic of a midpoint between West and East Nordic, unlike the Swedish language. They also show some similarities with the dialects of the other counties bordering Dalarna. In the northernmost part of the county (i.e., the originally Norwegian parishes of Särna and Idre), a characteristic dialect reminiscent of eastern Norwegian is spoken. Dalecarlian dialects are traditionally regarded as part of the Svealand dialect group.

Some Dalecarlian dialects takes up an intermediate position between East Nordic (Swedish–Danish) and West Nordic (Norwegian, Icelandic and Faroese). Kroonen cites a number of features that Elfdalian (a dalecarlian language) in particular shares with West Nordic, and writes: "In many aspects, Elfdalian, takes up a middle position between East and West Nordic. However, it shares some innovations with West Nordic, but none with East Nordic. This invalidates the claim that Elfdalian split off from Old Swedish."

In everyday speech, many with Dalecarlian often also refer to regionally coloured Standard Swedish from Dalarna, that is, a lexically and morphologically "national" Swedish with characteristic Dalarna intonation and prosody. In linguistics, one distinguishes between regionally coloured national languages and genuine dialects, and Dalecarlian is used exclusively for dialects in the latter sense.

Geographical distribution 

Varieties of Dalecarlian are generally classified geographically:
Ovansiljan, north of the Siljan lake: sockens Ore, Orsa, Våmhus, Älvdalen (Elfdalian), Mora, Venjan, Sollerön.
Nedansiljan, south of the Siljan lake: sockens Boda, Rättvik, Bjursås, Ål, Siljansnäs, Leksand, Gagnef.
Upper Västerdalarna: sockens Lima, Transtrand. 
Lower Västerdalarna: sockens Malung, Äppelbo, Järna, Nås, Floda, the parishes of Mockfjärd in Gagnefs socken.
Floda and Mockfjärd can be considered a separate group.

Dalecarlian proper (especially in Älvdalen, Mora and Orsa, to some extent also in Ore, Rättvik and Leksand), as well as western Dalecarlian varieties are markedly different from Swedish, and are considered to be distinct language varieties by linguists, despite their lack of recognition as such. Elfdalian is the one of the Dalecarlian languages that best kept their older features. It attracted interest from researchers early on, as it is labeled a dialect by the Swedish authorities despite that it developed independently from Swedish or Old Swedish. In many ways, it is very archaic. In other ways, it has distinguished itself from the ancient language and developed special features that are rare in other languages. A characteristic of the varieties are a pronunciation split in a number of easily distinguishable local dialects, which often only cover a single village or even part of a village.

For strangers, Dalecarlian varieties are virtually incomprehensible without special studies. However, this does not apply to the same extent with the Rättvik and Leksand dialects. They are more easily understood and can be considered to form a transitional stage between the Dalecarlian languages, and a dialect of Swedish with Dalecarlian remnants. Such transition tongues are also the tongues of Ål, Bjursås and Gagnef. The Gagnef dialect approaches the western Dalecarlian varieties, which to some extent can also be regarded as transitional dialects, but which in many respects take on a more independent position, especially in the upper parishes. They may show similarities with neighbouring Norwegian dialects.

There is a quite large difference between Gagnef and the Stora Tuna dialect, which belongs to the Dalecarlian Bergslagen dialects, a relatively uniform and fairly normal Swedish dialect complex that covers the entire southern Dalarna (Stora Kopparberg, Hedemora and Västerbergslagen). The most unique within this complex are the dialects of Svärdsjö and western Bergslagen, which are approaching Hälsingemål and Western Dalecarlian proper, respectively (via Grangärde and Floda). Dalecarlian Bergslagen dialects are also spoken in the northern part of Västmanland. The Dalecarlian Bergslagen dialects are quite closely connected with the neighbouring Svealand Swedish, perhaps most with the dialects of eastern Västmanland.

Phonology

As with most dialects in northern and central Sweden, the Dalecarlian dialects have a supradental heavy-r and a cachuminal (with the tip of the tongue towards the trough) have thick-l. However, superdental numbers are more limited than usual, for example, rs often becomes ss (for example, Dalecarlian koss, Swedish kors, English cross), rn in southern Dalarna becomes r (for example, Dalecarlian bar, Swedish barn, English child, Dalecarlian björ, Swedish björn, English bear, up to and including Rättvik, Leksand and Västerdalarna). In Dalecarlian proper is often nn, and rt, rd preserved without assimilation (from Gagnef northwards). l is not usually cachuminal after i and e, except in Dalecarlian proper, which in the case of l has gone its own way and can even partially use cachuminal l at the beginning of words, for example låta. 

Dalecarlian has, in the usual way, lost -n and, as a rule, -t in unstressed endings, for example, Dalecarlian sola or sole, Swedish solen, English sun, Dalecarlian gâtu, Swedish gatan, English street, Dalecarlian biti, Swedish bitit, English bitten. Like other Upper Swedish dialects, they often have i in endings for the national languages e, for example Dalecarlian funnin, Swedish funnen, English found, Dalecarlian muli, Swedish mulet, English cloudy, Dalecarlian härvil, Swedish härvel, English härvel (winding yarn on), has g-sounds, not j, in rg and lg, for example Dalecarlian and Swedish varg, English wolf, long vowel in front of m in many words, where the national language has short, for example Dalecarlian tima, Swedish timme, English hour, Dalecarlian töm, Swedish tom, English empty. jhas not disappeared without trace after k, g in words such as Dalecarlian äntja, Swedish änka, English widow, Dalecarlian bryddja, Swedish brygga, English bridge. As in the northern Swedes and in the northern dialects, g, k have also been softened to tj, (d) j, for example Dalecarlian sättjin or sättjen, Swedish säcken, English bag, Dalecarlian botja or botje Swedish boken, English book, Dalecarlian nyttjil, Swedish nyckel, English key. These traits characterise all Dalecarlian dialects.

Characteristic of the vocal system in especially Upper Dalarna, with the exception of Dalecarlian proper, is the use of open and end a, which is used in a completely different way than in the national language: the open can occur as far and the closed as short, for example hara hare with open a in first, end in second syllable, katt, bakka, vagn with end, skabb, kalv with open a; open å sound (o) is often replaced by a sound between å and ö; The u sound has a sound similar to the Norwegian u; ä and e are well separated; the low-pitched vocals often have a sound of ä. Among the most interesting features of the dialects in Älvdalen, Mora and Orsa is that they still largely retain the nasal vocal sounds that were previously found in all Nordic dialects. Furthermore, it is noticed that the long i, y, u diphthongs, usually to ai, åy, au, for example Dalecarlian ais, Swedish is English ice, Dalecarlian knåyta, Swedish knyta, English tie, Dalecarlian aute, Swedish ute, English out. v has the Old Norse pronunciation w (like w in English)[3], l is usually omitted in front of g, k, p, v, for example, Dalecarlian kåv, Swedish kalf, English calf, Dalecarlian fok and such Swedish folk, English people. h is omitted, for example, Dalecarlian and, Swedish and English hand (in the Älvdals-, Orsa- and Mora dialects, as well as in Rättvik and parts of Leksand). In the same way, many words have been added as h:n such as häven, hälsklig, hägde. These features have the common Dalecarlian in common with the older Uppland dialects.
A pair of ancient Nordic diphthongs remain in the western Dalecarlian dialects in Lima and Transtrand. The diphthong au, which in the Swedish state has pronounced ö, has in these areas a slightly changed form, ôu, for example dôu (Swedish död, English death). The ancient Swedish diphthongs ei and öy (which in Swedish became e and ö respectively) have been pronounced äi, for example skäi (Swedish sked, English Spoon) and here (Swedish hö, English hay), respectively.

References

Notes

Sources 
 Adolf Noreen "Dalmålet. I. Inledning till dalmålet. II. Ordlista öfver dalmålet i Ofvansiljans fögderi" ur Svenska landsmålen IV, Stockholm 1881 + 1882
 Carl Säve "Dalmålet" 1903
 Lars Levander "Dalmålet: beskrivning och historia I-II", Uppsala 1925-28
 Bengt Pamp, "Svenska dialekter", Lund 1978

Further reading

External links 
Listen to Dalecarlian
Leksandsmål – Sanfrid Blomquist (choose "äldre man", older man)
Map of different variants of Dalecarlian (PDF, from an article about Elfdalian)
Dalarna: Dalarnas folkspråk, runeberg.org

North Germanic languages
Dalarna
Swedish dialects